Resonant magnetic perturbations (RMPs) are a special type of magnetic field perturbations used to control burning plasma instabilities called edge-localized modes (ELMs) in magnetic fusion devices such as tokamaks. The efficiency of RMPs for controlling ELMs was first demonstrated on the tokamak DIII-D in 2003.

Normally the rippled magnetic field will only suppress ELMs for very narrow ranges of the plasma current.

See also
Plasma instability
COMPASS tokamak
NSTX-U, also uses RMPs to control ELMs

References

Further reading
 Effect of resonant magnetic perturbations on ELMs in connected double null plasmas in MAST
 RMP ELM suppression in DIII-D plasmas with ITER similar shapes and collisionalities 2008, RMP for ITER-like plasma triangularity is harder
 Connection between plasma response and RMP ELM suppression in DIII-D Wingen 2015 free access
 Wide Operational Windows of Edge-Localized Mode Suppression by Resonant Magnetic Perturbations in the DIII-D Tokamak 2020 "The model predicts that wide q95 windows of ELM suppression can be achieved at substantially higher pedestal pressure in DIII-D by shifting to higher toroidal mode number (n=4) RMPs."

Plasma physics
Tokamaks